Ziteil is a Roman Catholic pilgrimage site which was purportedly the location of a Marian apparition in the 1500s. The chapel is located at a height of 2,429 metres above sea level, between Piz Curvér and Piz Toissa, in the canton of Graubünden. It is claimed to be the highest elevation pilgrimage site in Europe.

External links

Official website
Ziteil on wanderland.ch

Roman Catholic chapels in Switzerland
Buildings and structures in Graubünden
Articles containing video clips
Roman Catholic churches in Switzerland